Children of a Lesser God is a 1986 American romantic drama film directed by Randa Haines from a screenplay written by Hesper Anderson and Mark Medoff based on Medoff's  1979 play of the same name. It stars William Hurt, Marlee Matlin (in her film debut), Piper Laurie, and Philip Bosco. The film's narrative follows two employees at a school for the deaf: a deaf custodian and a hearing speech teacher, whose conflicting ideologies on speech and deafness create tension and discord in their developing romantic relationship.

Children of a Lesser God premiered at the 37th Berlin International Film Festival, where it competed for the Golden Bear, while Haines received a Special Silver Bear. It was theatrically released on October 3, 1986, by Paramount Pictures to critical and commercial success. Reviewers praised Haines's direction, the screenplay, and particularly the performances of Hurt, Matlin, and Laurie. The film grossed $101.5 million worldwide on a $10.5 million budget. It received five nominations at the 59th Academy Awards: Best Picture, Best Actor (for Hurt), Best Supporting Actress (for Laurie), Best Adapted Screenplay, and Best Actress (for Matlin). At age 21, Matlin became the youngest Best Actress winner as well as the first deaf winner in Oscar history.

Plot 
An energetic new teacher, James Leeds (William Hurt), arrives at a school for the deaf and hard of hearing in New England. He soon sees a young deaf woman working as a janitor. The woman, Sarah Norman (Marlee Matlin), a former top student, is not well regarded by the hearing staff, but seems to integrate well with the deaf students. James begins to try to talk with her, arranging a meeting through her boss, pursuing her after school while she is attempting to clean, and persisting despite being rejected several times. She eventually agrees to go to dinner, and he watches her dance from the sidelines.

Sarah does not want to vocalize, and James eventually agrees not to try to force her to—a promise he later breaks. He finds out that Sarah refuses to visit her home, and assumes her mother (Piper Laurie) has stopped reaching out. Through her mother, James finds out that Sarah and her sister Ruth were popular, and according to her mother her peers treated Sarah as if she was not different from other women. Unfortunately, Sarah later reveals that she was sorely used by the unnamed "boys", and may have been a victim of sex abuse. Such treatment has led Sarah to mistrust men and resist interacting with anyone.  Later, in a pool scene, he walks in on her swimming nude. James confesses that he is falling in love with Sarah. She seems to be afraid. He falls into the pool on purpose, which changes the mood of the interaction.  They share a passionate kiss in the water, then James undresses. It is implied that they had sex that night for the first time.

The relationship between James and Sarah develops. The school superintendent warns James that he does not believe the relationship will work, but James is adamant that he will stay with Sarah because he loves her. James choreographs a dance with his deaf students, in which they lip-sync to a song on a stage in front of their parents. Sarah sees this performance and becomes upset. The conflict between James and Sarah persists as she thinks James hates her for not speaking. James convinces Sarah to leave her job and move in with him, although it is not clear what her plans for the future are. James's determination to hear Sarah speak and his inability to help her to develop individual pursuits frustrates her, and she feels he is patronizing her. They split up shortly after.

Sarah leaves James and goes to live with her estranged mother, reconciling with her in the process. James chases her, but she refuses to see him. After inquiring about her, James learns Sarah is working as a manicurist. Eventually, she and James reconcile at the school prom. They decide to learn how to stay connected in-between the world of silence and the world of sound.

Cast 
 William Hurt as James Leeds
 Marlee Matlin as Sarah Norman
 Piper Laurie as Mrs. Norman
 Philip Bosco as Dr. Curtis Franklin
 Allison Gompf as Lydia
 Bob Hiltermann as Orin
 Linda Bove as Marian Loesser

Production

Development
After meeting deaf actress Phyllis Frelich in 1977 at the University of Rhode Island's New Repertory Project, playwright Medoff wrote the play Children of a Lesser God to be her star vehicle. Based partially on Frelich's relationship with her hearing husband Robert Steinberg, the play chronicles the tumultuous relationship and marriage between a reluctant-to-speak deaf woman and an unconventional speech pathologist for the deaf. With Frelich starring, Children of a Lesser God opened on Broadway in 1980, received three Tony Awards, including Best Play, and ran for 887 performances before closing in 1982.

Following the vast success of his Broadway debut, Medoff, with fellow writer Anderson, penned a screenplay adapted from the original script. Though many changes were made, the core love story remained intact. The title of the film comes from the eleventh chapter ("The Passing of Arthur") of Alfred Lord Tennyson's Idylls of the King.

Filming
The movie was shot primarily in and around Saint John, New Brunswick, during the autumn of 1985, with the Rothesay Netherwood School serving as the main set. Aside from locations in Saint John and Rothesay Netherwood School, sets were constructed by Saint John local Keith MacDonald.

Release
The adaptation premiered at the Toronto International Film Festival on September 13, 1986, and was released widely in the United States on October 3 of the same year. Like its source material, the film generally gained praise from the hearing and deaf communities alike.

Reception

Box office
The film opened at number five at the box office in the United States and Canada with an opening weekend gross of $1,909,084. The film stayed in the top ten for eight weeks and grossed a total of $31,853,080. Internationally it grossed $69.6 million for a worldwide total of $101.5 million.

Critical reception

Children of a Lesser God received generally positive reviews. On Rotten Tomatoes, Children of a Lesser God holds an approval rating of 80% based on 35 reviews, with an average rating of 7.10/10. The site's critical consensus reads, "Children of a Lesser God transcends its transparently noble goals thanks to a pair of absorbing performances from William Hurt and Marlee Matlin." Particular praise was given to the film's two leads. Richard Schickel of Time magazine said of Matlin, "she has an unusual talent for concentrating her emotions--and an audience's--in her signing. But there is something more here, an ironic intelligence, a fierce but not distancing wit, that the movies, with their famous ability to photograph thought, discover in very few performances." Roger Ebert of the Chicago Sun-Times gave the film 3 out of a possible 4 stars, describing the subject matter as "new and challenging", saying he was "interested in everything the movie had to tell me about deafness." He continued, "The performances are strong and wonderful - not only by Hurt, one of the best actors of his generation, but also by Matlin, a deaf actress who is appearing in her first movie. She holds her own against the powerhouse she's acting with, carrying scenes with a passion and almost painful fear of being rejected and hurt, which is really what her rebellion is about." Paul Attanasio of The Washington Post said of the film, "This is romance the way Hollywood used to make it, with both conflict and tenderness, at times capturing the texture of the day-to-day, at times finding the lyrical moments when two lovers find that time stops." He goes on to say of Matlin, "The most obvious challenge of the role is to communicate without speaking, but Matlin rises to it in the same way the stars of the silent era did -- she acts with her eyes, her gestures."

There was some criticism that the film was told entirely from a hearing perspective, for a hearing audience. The film is not subtitled (neither the spoken dialogue nor the signing); instead, as Ebert observed, the signed dialogue is repeated aloud by Hurt's character, "as if to himself".

Awards and nominations
The film received five Academy Award nominations, with Marlee Matlin winning for Best Actress. Marlee Matlin was 21 years-old when she won, making her the youngest Best Actress winner to date and the first deaf Academy Award winner. Children of a Lesser God was the first ever female-helmed film to be nominated for Best Picture.

See also
List of films featuring the deaf and hard of hearing
Hearing loss

References

External links 
 
 

1986 films
1986 directorial debut films
1986 romantic drama films
American romantic drama films
American Sign Language films
Films about deaf people
Films about educators
American films based on plays
American independent films
Films directed by Randa Haines
Films featuring a Best Actress Academy Award-winning performance
Films featuring a Best Drama Actress Golden Globe-winning performance
Films scored by Michael Convertino
Films set in Maine
Films shot in New Brunswick
Paramount Pictures films
Silver Bear for outstanding artistic contribution
1980s English-language films
1980s American films
Films about disability